Samuel J. Groom is an American actor noted for his work on television.

Groom was born in Columbus, Ohio. 

Groom portrayed Tom Eldridge in the CBS drama Our Private World (1965),.  Following the cancellation of that prime-time serial, he replaced Ronnie Welch as Lee Pollock on The Edge of Night before he replaced Joey Trent as Dr. Russ Matthews on Another World, and he played the title role in the syndicated television series Dr. Simon Locke (1971),  and its spinoff, Police Surgeon.  Groom appeared on Gunsmoke in 1972 and 1973 (episodes "No Tomorrow" and "The Child Between" respectively). He also played Hal Sterling, the father of a castaway family, on the 1980s science fiction television series Otherworld. During the 1980s, Groom also was a spokesperson for American Motors, appearing in many commercials for the popular American Motors' Concord and American Motors' Eagle model lineups. He later played Joseph Orsini in the soap opera All My Children in 1993.

Groom made guest appearances in Law & Order; Murder, She Wrote; The Love Boat; Hill Street Blues; Quincy, M.E.; Gunsmoke; The Feather and Father Gang; The Bionic Woman; and The Time Tunnel as a young scientist named Jerry. In 1976, he appeared both in an episode of Sara and in Territorial Men, a television movie version of the series.

His film career included roles in Act One (1963), The Baby Maker (1970), Time Travelers (1976), Run for the Roses (1977), Institute for Revenge (1979), Hanging by a Thread (1979), The Day the Loving Stopped (1981), Deadly Eyes (1982), and as John F. Kennedy in the television miniseries Blood Feud (1983).

He has three children from his first marriage to Kathleen Sullivan (1962 - 1974), Samuel (born in 1962), Patrick (born in 1964), and Christopher (born in 1966). Groom married actress Suzanne Rogers in 1980. They divorced in 1982. He currently is on the faculty at HB Studio in New York City.

See also
List of people with surname Groom

References

External links

Sam Groom images on Bing

Living people
American male television actors
Male actors from Columbus, Ohio
Year of birth missing (living people)